The IBM Award was an award given out to National Basketball Association players from 1984 to 2002.  The award was sponsored and calculated by technology company IBM and was determined by a computer formula, which measured a player's statistical contribution to his team. The player with the best contribution to his team in the league received the award. The first recipient was Magic Johnson of the Los Angeles Lakers, and the final recipient was Tim Duncan of the San Antonio Spurs.

Most of the players who won the award have been forwards or centers; many finished near the top in rebounding the year they won.  The award was given out nineteen times, six times to players on the San Antonio Spurs, three times each to players on the Philadelphia 76ers and Los Angeles Lakers, and twice each to players on the Chicago Bulls and Detroit Pistons.  David Robinson won five IBM Awards, Charles Barkley won three, and Michael Jordan and Shaquille O'Neal won two each.

As of Tim Duncan's selection to the Naismith Memorial Basketball Hall of Fame in 2020, all IBM Award winners who are eligible for it have been inducted.  Jordan, Robinson, Barkley, Johnson, Duncan, Shaquille O’Neal, Karl Malone, and Hakeem Olajuwon also won NBA Most Valuable Player awards during their career; Robinson, O’Neal and Duncan won both awards in the same season.  Jordan, Robinson, Olajuwon, Dennis Rodman and Dikembe Mutombo have won the NBA Defensive Player of the Year Award; Olajuwon is the only player to win both in the same season.  Grant Hill is the only winner of the IBM Award who did not win an NBA MVP or Defensive Player of the Year Award sometime in his career.  O'Neal is the only player to win an IBM Award and an NBA title in the same season; he did this in both the 1999–00 and 2000–01 NBA seasons.  Jordan and Robinson are the only players to win the IBM Award during their respective rookie seasons, both also won the NBA Rookie of the Year Award in those years.  Two of the award winners were born outside the United States: Olajuwon (Nigeria) and Mutombo (Zaire).  Duncan was born in the U.S. Virgin Islands.  The award was discontinued in 2002.  With Tim Duncan's retirement following the 2015-16 NBA season, there are no more IBM Award winners currently playing in the NBA.

The IBM Award was originally named the Pivotal Player Award and was sponsored by the Schick razor company.

Winners

Formula
The IBM Award was calculated with the following formula:

In the formula, plyr stands for player, PTS stands for points, FGA stands for field goal attempts, REB stands for rebounds, AST stands for assists, STL stands for steals, BLK stands for blocks, PF stands for personal fouls, and TO stands for turnovers.  The award was given to the player with the highest total.

The formula bears some resemblance to player efficiency rating, and many winners of the IBM award were calculated to have finished at or near the top in player efficiency rating in their award-winning seasons.

Notes

  Won the NBA Most Valuable Player Award in same season 
  Won the NBA Defensive Player of the Year Award in same season
  Hakeem Olajuwon was born in Nigeria, but became a naturalized United States citizen in 1993.
  Zaire was renamed the Democratic Republic of the Congo in May 1997.
  Tim Duncan was born in the U.S. Virgin Islands, but is a U.S. citizen and has played for the U.S. Olympic Team. Despite this, the NBA considers him an international player.

References
General (for list of winners and their teams)

 
 

Specific

Awards established in 1984
Awards disestablished in 2002
Award
National Basketball Association awards
National Basketball Association lists